Myxophaga is the second-smallest suborder of the Coleoptera after Archostemata, consisting of roughly 65 species of small to minute beetles in four families. The members of this suborder are aquatic and semiaquatic, and feed on algae.

Description
Myxophaga have several diagnostic features: the antennae are more or less distinctly clubbed with usually fewer than nine segments, mesocoxal cavities are open laterally and bordered by a mesepimeron and metanepisternum, the hind wings are rolled apically in the resting positions. Internally, they are characterised by the presence of six malpighian tubules and the testes are tube-like and coiled.

Beetles of this suborder are adapted to feed on algae. Their mouthparts are characteristic in lacking galeae and having a mobile tooth on their left mandible.

Taxonomy
There are four extant families in the suborder Myxophaga divided between two superfamilies, containing about 65 described species, and at least one extinct family.

Superfamily Lepiceroidea Hinton, 1936
Family Lepiceridae Hinton, 1936
Lepicerus Hinton, 1936
†Lepiceratus Jałoszyński et al. 2020
Superfamily Sphaeriusoidea Erichson, 1845
Family Hydroscaphidae LeConte, 1874
 Hydroscapha LeConte, 1874
 Scaphydra Reichardt, 1973
 Yara Reichardt & Hinton, 1976
Confossa Short, Joly, García & Maddison, 2015
Family Sphaeriusidae Erichson, 1845
Sphaerius Waltl, 1838
Bezesporum Fikáček et al. 2022
†Burmasporum Kirejtshuk 2009
†Crowsonaerius Li & Cai in Li et al. 2023
Family Torridincolidae Steffan, 1964
 Claudiella Reichardt & Vanin, 1976
 Delevea Reichardt, 1976
 Iapir Py-Daniel, da Fonseca & Barbosa, 1993
 Incoltorrida Steffan, 1973
 Satonius Endrödy-Younga, 1997
 Torridincola Steffan, 1964
 Ytu Reichardt, 1973
Family †Triamyxidae Qvarnström et al. 2021
†Triamyxa Qvarnström et al. 2021
Unplaced in family
†Leehermania Chatzimanolis et al. 2012

Distribution
Living members of Lepiceridae are confined to northern South America and Central America. Members of Sphaeriusidae occur on all continents except Antarctica, while Hydroscaphidae occurs on all continents except Australia and Antarctica. Torridincolidae occurs in Africa, Asia, and South America.

Fossil record 
The fossil record of myxophagan beetles is sparse, likely due to their small size limiting preservation potential. The currently oldest myxophagan is Triamyxa, described in 2021 from numerous specimens of found in a coprolite found in Late Triassic (Carnian) aged sediments in Poland. It was placed in its own monotypic family Triamyxidae, and was resolved as either the most basal myxophagan or sister to Hydroscaphidae. The next oldest is Leehermania from the Late Triassic (Norian) Cow Branch Formation of North Carolina, which had previously been interpreted as the oldest known rove beetle but in 2019 was reinterpreted as an early diverging relative of the family Hydroscaphidae.  A fossil impression assigned to the living genus Hydroscapha in Hydroscaphidae is known from the Yixian Formation in the Jehol Biota, dating from the Early Cretaceous (Aptian). Fossils from the early Late Cretaceous (Cenomanian) aged Burmese amber from Myanmar, have been assigned to the extant genus Lepicerus and extinct genus Lepiceratus within Lepiceridae, as well as the extant Sphaerius and Bezesporum and the extinct Burmasporum and Crowsonaerius, belonging to Sphaerusidae.

Gallery

See also 
 List of subgroups of the order Coleoptera

Notes

References

External links 

 
Insect suborders
Beetles described in 1955
Beetles of North America
Beetles of Asia